Hinton station may refer to:

Hinton railway station (England), a former station in Hinton-on-the-Green, Worcestershire
Hinton station (Alberta), a Canadian National Railway station in Hinton, Alberta
Hinton station (West Virginia), an Amtrak station in Hinton, West Virginia

See also
Hinton (disambiguation)
Hinton Admiral railway station